Overton Loyd (born April 20, 1954) is an American artist best known for creating the cover art for the Parliament album Motor Booty Affair and several other records. His style of art varies often from work to work, and can range from loose sketches and paintings to fully fleshed out pieces.  He is a friend of George Clinton of Parliament, and most of the subjects for his art are either Clinton or Parliament.

Loyd's contribution to Motor Booty Affair was considerable. The original LP was released in several different configurations. The main release consisted of a gate-fold album cover, with Loyd's artwork on the front and back covers. His illustrations included cartoon portraits of some of the "characters" mentioned in the songs on the album, including "Mr. Wiggles the Worm." There was also a picture disk, with Loyd's illustration printed directly on the vinyl LP. Finally, there was a special edition that included cardboard cutout figures featuring Loyd's cartoon illustrations of most of the characters mentioned in the songs.

When Parliament went on tour in support of Motor Booty Affair, Loyd designed costumes for members of the band based on the cartoon illustrations he had made for the album cover.

In 1977, Loyd illustrated a comic book that was included in Parliament's Funkentelechy Vs. the Placebo Syndrome, portraying the epic battle between Sir Nose D’Voidoffunk and Starchild (see P-Funk mythology).  In the cartoon, which echoes the lyrics to the songs on the album, Sir Nose, who is determined not to dance, is ultimately defeated by Starchild, who is equipped with his Bop Gun, when Starchild shines a Flash Light on him.

Loyd was also responsible for the artwork on Bootsy's Rubber Band's This Boot Is Made for Fonk-N and Parliament's Gloryhallastoopid (Or Pin the Tail on the Funky), both released in 1979.

Loyd was recognized by Billboard for "Best Use of Computer Graphics" for his 1982 video for George Clinton's "Atomic Dog."

Loyd was the featured caricaturist on the American television game show Win, Lose or Draw.

In November 2006, Loyd was the guest art director for two episodes of the animated television series Class of 3000 on Cartoon Network.

Loyd is African-American.

References

Further reading 
 David Mills, Larry Alexander, Thomas Stanley, and Aris Thomas, George Clinton and P-Funk: An Oral History (New York: Avon, 1998).
 Rickey Vincent, Funk: The Music, The People, and The Rhythm of The One (New York: St. Martin's Griffin, 1996) .
 Grant Scott, Barry Miles, and Johnny Morgan, The Greatest Album Covers of All Time (New York: Sterling Publishing, 2005) . Page 121. Available at Google Book Search
 Wax Poetics Issue 18, Parliament-Funkadelic, August/September 2006, interview by Richard Edson and Edward Hill entitled "Bop Art". Page 121.  Available at Wax Poetic Back-issues,  Overton Loyd Interview.

External links 
 Overton Loyd's website

1954 births
20th-century American painters
American male painters
21st-century American painters
American illustrators
American comics artists
American caricaturists
American surrealist artists
American animators
Album-cover and concert-poster artists
P-Funk members
Living people